Robert Douglas Benton (born September 29, 1932) is an American screenwriter and film director. He is best known as the writer and director of the film Kramer vs. Kramer, for which he won the Academy Award for Best Director and Best Adapted Screenplay. He had previously written the screenplay (with David Newman) for the film Bonnie and Clyde.

Early life
Benton was born in Waxahachie, Texas, the son of Dorothy (née Spaulding) and Ellery Douglass Benton, a telephone company employee. He attended the University of Texas and Columbia University.

Career
In 1959, he co-wrote the book The IN and OUT Book with Harvey Schmidt, published by The Viking Press. He was the art director at Esquire in the early 1960s.

Benton won the Academy Awards for Best Adapted Screenplay and Best Director for Kramer vs. Kramer (1979) and Best Original Screenplay for Places in the Heart (1984).

Benton garnered three additional Oscar nominations: two for Best Original Screenplay for both Bonnie and Clyde (1967) and The Late Show (1977) and one for Best Adapted Screenplay for Nobody's Fool (1994).

He also directed Twilight (1998) and Feast of Love (2007), and co-wrote the screenplays for Superman (1978) and The Ice Harvest (2005).

In 2006, he appeared in the documentary Wanderlust.

Personal life
He married artist Sallie Rendig in 1964.

Films

Films

Writing/producing

Theatre

Film awards

Wins
 1978 - Edgar Award for Best Motion Picture Screenplay for The Late Show
 1980 - Academy Award for Best Adapted Screenplay for Kramer vs. Kramer
 1980 - Academy Award for Best Director for Kramer vs. Kramer
 1980 - Golden Globe Award for Best Screenplay - Motion Picture for Kramer vs. Kramer
 1980 - Directors Guild of America Award for Outstanding Directorial Achievement in Motion Pictures for Kramer vs. Kramer
 1984 - People's Choice Award at the Toronto International Film Festival
 1985 - Academy Award for Best Original Screenplay for Places in the Heart
 1985 - Silver Bear for Best Director at the 35th Berlin International Film Festival for Places in the Heart
 2007 - Laurel Award for Screenwriting Achievement

Nominations
 1968 - Academy Award for Writing Original Screenplay for Bonnie and Clyde
 1968 - Golden Globe for Best Screenplay for Bonnie and Clyde
 1977 - Golden Bear at Berlin for The Late Show
 1978 - Academy Award for Writing Original Screenplay for The Late Show
 1980 - Golden Globe for Best Director - Motion Picture for Kramer vs. Kramer
 1981 - César Award for Best Foreign Film for Kramer vs. Kramer
 1985 - Academy Award for Directing for Places in the Heart
 1985 - Directors Guild of America Award for Outstanding Directorial Achievement in Motion Pictures for Places in the Heart
 1985 - Golden Globe for Best Screenplay - Motion Picture for Places in the Heart
 1995 - Academy Award for Writing Adapted Screenplay for Nobody's Fool

References

Archival sources 
 The Robert Benton Papers 1969-1994 (24 linear feet) are housed at the Wittliff Collections, Texas State University in San Marcos.

External links

 Profile of Robert Benton in The New York Observer
 "Robert Benton’s Portland Feast" from Willamette Week
 
 
 

1932 births
American male screenwriters
Best Adapted Screenplay Academy Award winners
Best Directing Academy Award winners
Best Original Screenplay Academy Award winners
Columbia University alumni
Edgar Award winners
Hugo Award-winning writers
Living people
People from Waxahachie, Texas
Silver Bear for Best Director recipients
University of Texas at Austin alumni
Writers Guild of America Award winners
Film directors from Texas
Best Screenplay Golden Globe winners
Directors Guild of America Award winners
Screenwriters from Texas